Čelákovice is a town in Prague-East District in the Central Bohemian Region of the Czech Republic. It has about 12,000 inhabitants. The town is part of the central bohemian area.

Administrative parts
The villages of Císařská Kuchyně, Sedlčánky and Záluží are administrative parts of Čelákovice.

Geography
It lies in the Central Elbe Table, in the Polabí lowlands.

History
The site of the town has been inhabited since the Stone Age. During the 9th century, an early Slavic settlement was established. The first written mention of Čelákovice is from 1290. The inhabitants subsisted on fishing and agriculture, and from the mid-19th century also on the production of baskets.

Demographics

Economy
The engineering factory known as TOS (Továrna obráběcích strojů) was founded in 1910. It remains the largest industrial plant in the town.

Sights

Around 1300, a stone fortress was built here. The fortress, reconstructed in 1973–1982 in the Gothic–Renaissance style, serves as a town museum today.

The Church of the Assumption of the Virgin Mary was originally a Romanesque structure, rebuilt in the Renaissance style in the 16th century and in the Baroque style in 1708–1712.

Notable people
Alois Vašátko (1908–1942), World War II wing commander
František Čáp (1913–1972), Czech-Yugoslav film director and screenwriter
Eduard Petiška (1924–1987), writer of children books
Pavel Tykač (born 1964), entrepreneur

International relations
Čelákovice has no twin towns and one partner city:
 Chengdu, China

Gallery

References

External links

Town Museum

Cities and towns in the Czech Republic
Populated places in Prague-East District